The 1989-90 Four Hills Tournament took place at the four traditional venues of Oberstdorf, Garmisch-Partenkirchen, Innsbruck and Bischofshofen, located in Germany and Austria, between 28 December 1989 and 6 January 1990.

Results

Overall

References

External links 
  

1989-90
1989 in ski jumping
1990 in ski jumping
1989 in German sport
1990 in German sport
1990 in Austrian sport
December 1989 sports events in Europe
January 1990 sports events in Europe